Çamlıhemşin District is a district of the Rize Province of Turkey. Its seat is the town of Çamlıhemşin. Its area is 897 km2, and its population is 6,929 (2021).

Composition
There is one municipality in Çamlıhemşin District:
 Çamlıhemşin

There are 26 villages in Çamlıhemşin District:

 Behice
 Boğaziçi
 Çatköy
 Çayırdüzü
 Derecik
 Didi
 Dikkaya
 Güllüköy
 Güroluk
 Kale
 Komilo
 Köprübaşı
 Meydanköy
 Mollaveyis
 Ortaklar
 Ortanköy
 Ortayayla
 Sıraköy
 Şenköy
 Şenyuva
 Topluca
 Yaylaköy
 Yazlık
 Yolkıyı
 Yukarışimşirli
 Zilkale

References

Districts of Rize Province